Céline Roseline Laporte (born 7 December 1984 in Cannes, France) is a female athlete from Seychelles now based in France. She represented France until 2003.

She competed at the 2006 Commonwealth Games, where she received a bronze medal in the women's long jump. She competed in the 100 metres hurdles at the 2004 Summer Olympics and the 2005 World Championships.
In 2006, she won the silver medal in the heptathlon at the African Championships

Achievements

External links

1984 births
Living people
French female long jumpers
French female hurdlers
French heptathletes
People with acquired Seychellois citizenship
Seychellois female hurdlers
Olympic athletes of Seychelles
Athletes (track and field) at the 2004 Summer Olympics
Athletes (track and field) at the 2006 Commonwealth Games
Commonwealth Games bronze medallists for Seychelles
World Athletics Championships athletes for Seychelles
Commonwealth Games medallists in athletics
French people of Seychellois descent
Sportspeople from Cannes
Seychellois female long jumpers
Athletes (track and field) at the 2003 All-Africa Games
African Games competitors for Seychelles
Medallists at the 2006 Commonwealth Games